Hospital of St John the Baptist may mean:

 Hospital of St John the Baptist, Arbroath, Scotland
 Hospital of St John the Baptist, High Wycombe, England
 Hospital of St John the Baptist, Winchester, England

See also
 Hospitium of St John the Baptist, of Reading Abbey, England
Brothers Hospitallers of Saint John of God, a Catholic order
 Knights Hospitaller, or Order of Knights of the Hospital of Saint John of Jerusalem, a medieval and early modern Catholic military order
Order of Saint John (chartered 1888), or Most Venerable Order of the Hospital of Saint John of Jerusalem, a British royal order of chivalry